Van Buren Township is one of seventeen townships in Kosciusko County, Indiana. As of the 2010 census, its population was 4,168 and it contained 1,881 housing units.

Van Buren Township was organized in 1836.

Geography

Cities and towns
 Milford

Unincorporated towns
 DeFries Landing at 
 Milford Junction at 
 Musquabuck Park at 
 Redmon Park at 
 Shady Banks at 
(This list is based on USGS data and may include former settlements.)

Education
Van Buren Township residents may obtain a free library card from the Milford Public Library.

References

External links
 Indiana Township Association
 United Township Association of Indiana

Townships in Kosciusko County, Indiana
Townships in Indiana